is a 1987 Japanese book by Jun'ya Yokota and Shingo Aizu about Shunro Oshikawa, the early twentieth century pioneer of Japanese science fiction. The book won the 1988 Nihon SF Taisho Award.

Publication history
 with Shingo Aizu (December 1987, Pan Research Institute)
 with Shingo Aizu (April 1991, Tokuma Shoten)

Awards and honors
Kaidanji Oshikawa Shunrō: Nihon SF no Oya received the following awards and honors:

References

Biographies about writers
Japanese books
1988 non-fiction books